The Colbert class were a pair of armored frigates built for the French Navy during the 1870s. The ships served as the flagships of the commander and deputy commander of the Mediterranean Squadron for most of their careers. The sister ships took part in the French conquest of Tunisia, notably shelling and landing troops in Sfax in 1881. They were relegated to second-line roles in 1894–95 before being condemned in 1900. The ships were finally sold for scrap in 1909.

Design and description
The Colbert-class ships were designed by Constructor Sabattier as improved versions of the ironclad  and were the last ships authorized by the 1857 Naval Program. They reverted to a single propeller shaft to improve their sailing qualities and to lessen the chance of the propellers being fouled by fallen rigging. As central battery ironclads, they had their armament concentrated amidships. Like most ironclads of their era, they were equipped with a plough-shaped ram. The ships' crew numbered 774 officers and men. Their metacentric height was low, a little above .

While the exact reason for such prolonged construction time is not known, it is believed that reduction of the French Navy's budget after the Franco-Prussian War of 1870–71 and out-of-date work practices in French dockyards were likely causes.

Propulsion
The Colbert class had a single Wolf three-cylinder horizontal return connecting-rod compound steam engine that drove one propeller.

Armament

The Colberts had two  guns mounted in barbettes on the upper deck, one gun at the forward corners of the battery, with six additional guns on the battery deck below the barbettes. The side of the upper deck were cut away to improve the ability of the barbette guns to bear fore and aft. One  gun was mounted in the forecastle as a chase gun. The ship's secondary armament consisted of six  guns, four forward of the battery and two aft. These latter two guns were replaced in 1878 by another 240-millimeter gun as a stern chaser. The ship also mounted four above-water  torpedo tubes.

All of the guns could fire both solid shot and explosive shells.

At some point the ship received fourteen to eighteen  Hotchkiss 5-barrel revolving guns.

Armor

Ships

Service
Colbert served as the flagship of the Mediterranean Squadron from 1879 to 1890 when she was placed in reserve. Trident became the flagship of the second-in-command of the squadron in 1879. The sisters bombarded the port of Sfax on 15–16 July 1881 as the French occupied Tunisia, under the command of Vice Admiral Henri Garnault.

Colbert was recommissioned in 1892 before she was disarmed and paid off in 1895. Trident was disarmed and placed in reserve in 1886–89, but was recommissioned in 1889 and resumed her role as flagship until she was again placed in reserve in 1894. The ship served as a gunnery training ship until she was condemned in 1900. She was renamed Var in 1904 and was sold for scrap five years later. Colbert was also condemned in 1900 and sold for scrap in 1909.

Notes

References

External links
  classe Colbert

Ironclad classes
 
Ship classes of the French Navy